Craig Donald Ingham (born 26 July 1965 in Nelson) is a New Zealand cricketer who played for Central Districts Stags and for the Nelson in the Hawke Cup.

References 

Living people
New Zealand cricketers
Central Districts cricketers

1964 births
South Island cricketers